Gene McFadden (January 28, 1949 – January 27, 2006) was an American singer, songwriter, and record producer. He is best known as one of the key members of the Philadelphia International record label, and was one-half of the successful team of McFadden & Whitehead with John Whitehead.

Biography
McFadden met John Whitehead as a teenager and together they founded the Epsilons, a soul music group. The group was discovered by Otis Redding, who acted as their manager. They later toured with Redding until his death in 1967, after which, they signed with Kenny Gamble and Leon Huff’s Philadelphia International record label. McFadden & Whitehead soon gained attention for their songwriting ability when their song "Back Stabbers", recorded by The O'Jays, went to No. 3 on the Billboard Hot 100. The duo wrote many songs for other Philadelphia International artists and had hits such as Harold Melvin & the Blue Notes' "Wake Up Everybody (Part 1)", "Bad Luck", The Intruders' "I’ll Always Love My Mama," and their own, "Ain't No Stoppin' Us Now" (#1 R&B) in 1979. McFadden, along with Whitehead, was instrumental in defining the sound of Philadelphia soul.

McFadden was diagnosed with liver and lung cancer in 2004, and died from the disease at his home in the Mount Airy section of Philadelphia on January 27, 2006 (one day shy of his 57th birthday). He was survived by his wife Barbara, two daughters, and two sons.

References

Other sources
Jeckell, Barry A. (January 30, 2006). "R&B Artist/Songwriter Gene McFadden Dies". Billboard. Retrieved on April 13, 2007.
Perrone, Pierre (January 31, 2006). "Obituary". The Independent. Retrieved on April 13, 2007.

External links

1949 births
2006 deaths
Deaths from liver cancer
Deaths from lung cancer in Pennsylvania
African-American male singer-songwriters
Musicians from Philadelphia
Record producers from Pennsylvania
American soul musicians
Singer-songwriters from Pennsylvania
20th-century African-American male singers